Ciriaco Cano González (born 4 August 1948) is a retired Spanish footballer who played as a midfielder for Sporting de Gijón. After retiring as a player, he went on to coach, including for Sporting de Gijón.

References

External links

1948 births
Living people
People from Plasencia
Sportspeople from the Province of Cáceres
Spanish footballers
Footballers from Extremadura
Association football midfielders
La Liga players
Elche CF players
Sporting de Gijón players
Spanish football managers
La Liga managers
CP Cacereño managers
Sporting de Gijón managers
CD Castellón managers
Elche CF managers
CD Badajoz managers
CD Leganés managers